Guiseley and Rawdon is an electoral ward of Leeds City Council in the north west of Leeds, West Yorkshire, covering both the town of Guiseley, the majority of the village of Rawdon and the southern part of the town of Yeadon.

Councillors 

 indicates seat up for re-election.
 indicates seat up for election following resignation or death of sitting councillor.
* indicates incumbent councillor.

Elections since 2010

May 2022

May 2021

May 2019

May 2018

May 2016

May 2015

May 2014

May 2012

May 2011

October 2010 by-election

May 2010

See also
Listed buildings in Guiseley and Rawdon

Notes

References 

Wards of Leeds